Borzoli is a quartiere of the Italian city of Genoa, located west of the city centre.

References

Quartieri of Genoa